Timothy Lester Murphy (born October 9, 1956) is an American football coach and former player. He is the head football coach at Harvard University, a position he has held since 1994. Murphy served as the head coach at the University of Maine from 1987 to 1988 and the University of Cincinnati from 1989 to 1993.

Career
Under Murphy, the Harvard Crimson football program had enjoyed 16 consecutive winning seasons, from 2001 to 2016. His 2004 Harvard Crimson football team went 10–0 and was the only undefeated team during the 2004 NCAA Division I-AA football season. His 2014 Harvard team repeated the feat, again going 10–0 and achieving the only perfect mark during the 2014 NCAA Division I FCS football season.

In 2012, Murphy was elected president of the American Football Coaches Association.

Head coaching record

See also
 List of college football coaches with 200 wins
 List of college football coaches with 150 NCAA Division I FCS wins

References

External links
 Harvard profile

1956 births
Living people
American football linebackers
Boston University Terriers football coaches
Brown Bears football coaches
Cincinnati Bearcats football coaches
Harvard Crimson football coaches
Lafayette Leopards football coaches
Maine Black Bears football coaches
Springfield Pride football players
People from Kingston, Massachusetts
Sportspeople from Plymouth County, Massachusetts
Coaches of American football from Massachusetts
Players of American football from Massachusetts